The British Rail Class 55, also known as a Deltic, or English Electric Type 5, is a class of diesel locomotive built in 1961 and 1962 by English Electric for British Railways. They gained the name "Deltic" from the prototype locomotive, DP1 Deltic (the running number DP1 was never carried), which in turn was named after its Napier Deltic power units.

Despite their successes, the Deltics had a relatively short commercial service life of 20 years. From 1978 they were displaced by the next generation of high speed diesels, the "InterCity 125" High Speed Trains (HSTs) and the Deltics were subsequently relegated mostly to secondary services on the Kings Cross to York, Edinburgh and Hull routes, although they continued to operate some top-link trains until 1981, such as the Hull Executive. The high running costs of the Deltics meant that no viable alternative use could be found for the fleet, and all were withdrawn from service between January 1980 and December 1981. Six of the locomotives were saved for preservation.

Background

In 1955, the English Electric company produced a prototype diesel locomotive at the Dick, Kerr & Co works in Preston, officially named the DP1 but commonly known as DELTIC, this prototype experimentally used two Napier Deltic engines which had been developed for marine applications. These unconventional engines were configured in a triangle with an opposed piston design. They ran at high speed (1,500 RPM) more than twice that of conventionally configured engines, which made them very powerful relative to their size and weight, compared to the conventional diesel engines of the era.

The other notable features of the locomotive was its large size by British standards, and striking styling, which was inspired by the bulldog nosed American diesels of the era.

At the same time, the management of the British Railways Eastern Region were looking for a new generation of diesels to replace their pre-war fleet of Class A4 steam locomotives for use on top-link expresses on the East Coast Main Line. The management of the Eastern Region were unimpressed by the performance of the best conventional diesels of the time, the s, which for a weight of 133 tons, produced , which meant that their performance was no better than the steam locomotives they were supposed to replace. Gerry Fiennes, the traffic manager of the ECML, believed that his expresses would need a step-change in performance in order to remain competitive; impressed by the superior power and speed of the DELTIC prototype, he persuaded British Railways to purchase a fleet of locomotives based on it.

Production 

In March 1958, an order was placed with English Electric for a production fleet of 22 locomotives (reduced from the originally-planned 23), replacing more than twice that number (55) of Nigel Gresley Pacifics; as steam locomotives require substantial time to clean, fuel, and fire, such a reduction in the number of units could be undertaken without a corresponding reduction in working availability. The full order was worth £3,410,000, working out at £155,000, per locomotive. Due to the complexity of the engine design, which needed specialist maintenance, the locomotives were purchased under a five year service contract, with English Electric agreeing to maintain them, including their engines and generators, for a fixed price; this was British Rail's first such contract. Additional Deltic engines were produced to enable engines to be exchanged regularly for overhaul while keeping the locomotives in service. English Electric trained the British Rail staff at the Doncaster Works in the techniques of maintaining the engines, and after the contract ended, they took over this responsibility.

The production locomotives were built at the Vulcan Foundry at Newton-le-Willows, they were mechanically little changed from the prototype, but differed in appearance with a toned down styling, sporting a more sober colour scheme, and lacking the prototype's large headlight. The production Deltics were also 7 tons lighter than the prototype, weighing in at 99 tons, despite being nearly  longer. They were originally planned to be delivered within a year from March 1960, but this deadline was not met, and they were delayed by a year, with the first Deltic entering revenue service in the summer of 1961, with a full service being introduced the following year.

The locomotives were assigned to three locomotive depots: Finsbury Park in London, Gateshead near Newcastle, and Haymarket in Edinburgh. Very soon, all were named; the Gateshead and Edinburgh Haymarket locomotives after regiments of the British Army from the North-East of England and from Scotland, respectively, while Finsbury Park followed the London and North Eastern Railway (LNER) tradition of naming locomotives after winning racehorses.

These locomotives however, were far less successful in service than their larger cousins, and were all withdrawn by 1971.

British Rail service 

The introduction of the Deltics was a step change in locomotive performance on the East Coast Main Line. Once the entire fleet was delivered into service in 1962, the timetable was accelerated, with the journey time from London to Edinburgh cut by one hour, from seven hours to six; enabled by the Deltics' ability to rapidly accelerate and maintain high speed with a heavy train over long distances. This matched the timing of the pre-war A4-hauled Coronation service, but was achieved without priority over other traffic unlike the earlier LNER train, it was also now the timing of normal standard fare expresses throughout the day, and not just a once-a-day premium fare express. From 1966 the infrastructure on the ECML was progressively upgraded to allow higher speeds in order to take better advantage of the Deltics' capabilities; this included upgrading the track, and other improvements such as the easing of sharp curves and improving the alignments through various stations.

On one of O. S. Nock's first Deltic runs (the down Heart of Midlothian loaded to 13 coaches, 530 tons gross) he stated "once the tail of the train was over the 60 mph restriction the throttle was opened to the full, and the surge forward could be felt in the cab. Never previously had I felt a positive thrust in my back when in the second man's seat!" Nock went on to estimate that at 80 mph the locomotive was producing about 2,750 drawbar horsepower.

The ultimate Deltic performance came on 2 February 1978 with a run on the 07:25 from Newcastle to King's Cross. In some respects, the run was set up (the driver was about to retire) but the speeds were record-breaking. The locomotive was 55 008 The Green Howards; it was hauling 10 coaches (343 tons gross), and on the leg from York to London it achieved a timing of 137 min 15 sec. This included various signal stops and other enforced speed reductions; the net time is estimated at 115 min 45 sec, an average of  start to stop. The train achieved  on the flat between Darlington and York,  at Offord and  whilst descending Stoke Bank.

From 1978, the ECML was upgraded to allow 125 mph running, in order to accommodate the InterCity 125s, and although the Deltics were still officially limited to 100 mph, in practice they frequently exceeded this in service. Maintaining this schedule required sustained periods of running above 100 mph. The Hull Executive was one of the last top-link workings by a Deltic, until 1981, when this service was taken over by HST's.

The Railway Performance Society estimate that on modern infrastructure (the Selby Diversion etc.) a realistic Deltic-hauled schedule from King's Cross to Edinburgh would be around 4 hours 57 minutes (a theoretical unchecked run being around 4 hours 40 minutes). This would be for a train of 11 coaches and include a stop at Newcastle, the latter city being reached in a scheduled 3 hours 6 minutes.

The Deltics had arrived from the manufacturer painted in two-tone green, the dark BR green on top, with a narrower strip of a lighter, lime green along the bottom. This helped to disguise the bulk of the locomotive body. The cab window surrounds were picked out in cream-white. Although delivered without it, they all soon sported the bright yellow warning panel at each end common to all British diesel and electric locomotives, to make them more conspicuous. By 1966 the InterCity branding was introduced, and the Deltics began to be painted in corporate Rail Blue with yellow ends, the change generally coinciding with a works repair and the fitting of air brake equipment, the locomotives originally having only vacuum braking (the first so treated was D9002; the last to be painted blue was D9014). In the early 1970s they were fitted with Electric Train Heating (ETH) equipment to power Mark 2 air-conditioned coaches, while a couple of years later, with the introduction of BR's TOPS computer system, they were renumbered 55 001 to 55 022.

Withdrawal 

In the late 1970s, the Deltics began to take on secondary roles, gradually being supplanted by the next generation of express passenger services, namely the "InterCity 125" High Speed Train (HST) which were introduced on the ECML from 1978. At this time, British Rail had a general policy of not maintaining small non-standard fleets of locomotives, and when the HST fleet took over East Coast mainline services, it was obvious the class had a limited future. Various alternative uses for the fleet were examined, but this came to nothing: A significant weakness of the Deltics were their high running costs, due to the complexity of their engine design which required expensive specialist maintenance, which mitigated against their redeployment elsewhere. In their last years, the Deltics mostly operated the semi-fast services between London and York.

From 1980 to 1982, the fleet was gradually run down; no new spare parts were ordered for the declining fleet, and the locomotives were gradually withdrawn, and then cannibalised for spares to keep the others running. Withdrawn locomotives were taken to Doncaster for stripping and eventual scrapping. For a time the Deltic scrap line was a major draw for railway enthusiasts. In November 1981, the Doncaster Works dismantled its Deltic engine overhaul facility.

The National Railway Museum selected 55 002 The King's Own Yorkshire Light Infantry for preservation as part of the National Collection. The Friends of the National Railway Museum sponsored the repaint of 55 002 into original green livery for its last eighteen months in traffic, although it carried its TOPS number rather than D9002. As insurance, in case 55 002 should meet with a mishap during its last months, the withdrawn 55 005 The Prince of Wales's Own Regiment of Yorkshire was set aside from breaking up at Doncaster Works until Deltic operation on the main line had concluded.

The final service train run was the 16:30 Aberdeen-York service on 31 December 1981, hauled from Edinburgh by 55 019 Royal Highland Fusilier, arriving in York at just before midnight. The last train was an enthusiast special, the "Deltic Scotsman Farewell", on 2 January 1982, hauled from King's Cross to Edinburgh by 55 015 Tulyar and 55 022 Royal Scots Grey on the return. 55 009 Alycidon shadowed the train in both directions between Peterborough and Newcastle, in case of a failure of the train locomotive. Following the farewell, the surviving Deltics were moved to Doncaster Works, where they were displayed en masse in February 1982, before disposal commenced.

Accidents and incidents
On 15 December 1961, locomotive D9012 Crepello  was hauling an empty stock train when it ran into the rear of a freight train at Conington, Huntingdonshire during permissive block working. Another freight train then ran into the wreckage, followed a few minutes later by a third freight train.
 On 5 March 1967, locomotive No. 9004 Queens Own Highlander was hauling a passenger train that overran a signal and was derailed at Conington. Five people were killed and eighteen injured. The signalman had moved a set of points under the train. He was convicted of endangering persons travelling on the railway but was acquitted of manslaughter. He was sentenced to two years' imprisonment.
Six people were killed and 46 were injured.
The guard of the express was slightly injured. The cause of the accident was that the brakes on the carriages had become isolated, in a freak event, whilst the train was moving. The train had struck an object on the track, which had caused a traction motor cover to come loose. This struck the handle of the brake isolating cock, closing it and thus separating the brakes between the locomotive and train. Following the collision, the train was diverted onto the Tees Valley line, where it was brought to a halt by the operation of the communication cord in one of the carriages.

Preservation 

Six locomotives survive; all have run in preservation and all have operated on the mainline, although 55 015 only ran on the mainline at the Rocket 150 event in 1980. Two cabs are also preserved.

Current loco numbers are indicated in bold.

Loco details 
 D9000 (55 022) Royal Scots Grey was purchased by the Deltic 9000 Fund and, on 7 September 1983, was handed over in fully running condition after work and a repaint by BR. Its first base was the Nene Valley Railway. It was later accommodated by Network SouthEast at Selhurst and Old Oak Common depots, from where it regularly travelled to open days around the country. In 1996 it was overhauled by Railcare at St. Rollox railway works, Glasgow and received main-line certification. The Deltic 9000 Fund became a limited company (Deltic 9000 Locomotives Limited) and both D9000 and D9016 passed into its care. Its initial return to service, on the "Deltic Deliverance" charter, on 30 November 1996, was cut short by an exhaust stack fire (a regular Deltic problem in service days). Following rectification work at Springburn it ran to King's Cross on an empty stock train before resuming its second main-line career on 2 January 1997 on the "Deltic Reunion" charter to Hull and Harrogate, during which it visited the turntable within the National Railway Museum, where it stood alongside the prototype. It continued to work main line charter trains between 1997 and 2002 and was hired by both Anglia Railways and Virgin CrossCountry to operate service trains on their behalf, as cover for their locomotives. Following the demise of Deltic 9000 Locomotives Limited in 2004 the locomotive was sold to Beaver Sports (Yorks) Ltd. It completed an 18-month overhaul and was re-certified for running on the main line in August 2006. Royal Scots Grey has been repainted into blue livery, carrying the markings of York (YK depot) and York City coat of arms crests above the numbers, as done in 1981. It is the first Class 55 to carry the York coat of arms crest since 1982. The locomotive continues to work charters and to be available for spot hire to national operators. In 2015 the locomotive was repainted with 'Finsbury Park-style' white cab window surrounds and at various times has carried the identities of scrapped sister locomotives 55 003 Meld, 55 007 Pinza and 55 018 Ballymoss 55 022 alongside classmate 55 016 were later purchased by Locomotive Services Limited and since arriving at Crewe 55 022 has been undergoing an overhaul to return to the mainline hauling railtours for Locomotive Services Limited and its new charter train operator "Saphos Trains". Parts from 55 016 are being used in the engines overhaul while the latter engine is on static display in Margate.
 D9002 (55 002) The King's Own Yorkshire Light Infantry was donated to the National Railway Museum, York and was the first preserved Deltic to return to the main line when it worked light engine to York after participating in the Doncaster Works Open Day on 27 February 1982. 55 002 is one of three Deltics to hold mainline certification (along with D9000 Royal Scots Grey and D9009 Alycidon). 55 002 is rarely used on mainline charters and is mostly used to haul locomotives belonging to the National Railway Museum either between their two sites at York and Shildon or to other destinations such as Barrow Hill Engine Shed.
 D9009 (55 009) Alycidon was purchased by the Deltic Preservation Society (DPS). It was initially based at the North York Moors Railway before undergoing an extensive overhaul and restoration and recertification for main-line use. Following the DPS withdrawal from main-line operations it was mostly based at the DPS depot at Barrow Hill. It was recertified for mainline use in July 2012 after a long absence stretching back to 2003. On 3 March 2019, 55 009 was hauling the 'Auld Reekie' from Edinburgh - Doncaster where all 6 traction motors flashed over. 55 009 has not worked since and was hauled back to Burton by British Rail Class 67 67004. 55 009 is now at the Great Central Railway (heritage railway) for testing following extensive repairs.
 D9015 (55 015) Tulyar was purchased by a private buyer, Peter Sansom; in 1986 it was sold on to the Deltic Preservation Society. It has led a nomadic existence on many preserved railways and was the favoured DPS locomotive for open days during the 1990s (where it was sometimes presented in the guise of a scrapped sister locomotive, for example during 1994 when it appeared at various events numbered and named as 55 001 St Paddy. It is currently under major overhaul at the Deltic Preservation Society depot at Barrow Hill.
 D9016 (55 016) Gordon Highlander was purchased by the Deltic 9000 Fund, with the intention that it would be restored to running condition, whilst acting as a 'twelve wheeled mobile source of spares'. It was moved to Wansford, on the Nene Valley Railway to join D9000, where the temptation to restore it to operational condition became too great to resist. Eventually, like D9000, the locomotive left the railway for the Network SouthEast depots at Selhurst and Old Oak Common. After D9000 had been operating on the main line for three years the decision was made to overhaul and recertify D9016, to provide cover for Royal Scots Grey, and the locomotive was moved to Brush Traction at Loughborough. Following overhaul it spent a short period on the main line, on charter work, its operation sponsored by Porterbrook, in recognition of which it was painted in their purple and grey house colours, based upon the original two-tone green style. It lasted in this livery until 2002, when the original two-tone green livery was reapplied. Following the demise of Deltic 9000 Locomotives Limited the locomotive was purchased and based at the Peak Rail (Heritage Railway), near Bakewell, Derbyshire. In July 2008, this locomotive was sold by the private owner to Harry Needle Railroad Company (HNRC). In spite of previous announcements to the contrary, HNRC put the locomotive up for sale at the end of September 2008. Bids from the Gordon Highlander Preservation Group and Beaver Sports (Yorks) Ltd. (the owners of 55 022) were rejected by HNRC in favour of a higher offer from Direct Rail Services who kept D9016 at Barrow Hill for a year with the intention of a full overhaul but these plans never surfaced. The locomotive was sold one year later to Beaver Sports (Yorks) Ltd. and it was based at East Lancashire Railway with 55 022. The aim was to return D9016 to mainline condition once again. D9016 donated one of its two engines to 55 022 in April 2010 to replace one of 55 022's engines, a former marine example that had been temporarily fitted to 55 022 following an earlier engine failure. During 2014 D9016 left the East Lancashire Railway for the Great Central Railway. In January 2015 the locomotive moved to the Washwood Heath site of Boden Rail, for bodywork repairs. D9016, along with classmate 55 022, were later purchased by Locomotive Services Limited. D9016 required a cosmetic overhaul, owing to damaged areas. With the main intention being to return 55 022 to service first parts were taken off D9016 for use on 55 022 and after being given a cosmetic facelift. 16 was returned to its original BR Green with its pre-TOPS number, D9016. The engine would later be moved to Margate for static display at LSL's new museum at the Hornby factory.
 D9019 (55 019) Royal Highland Fusilier was purchased by the Deltic Preservation Society. Initially based at the North York Moors Railway, along with 55 009, the locomotive subsequently moved and spent several years at both the Great Central Railway and the East Lancashire Railway. It is now based at the Deltic Preservation Society  depot at Barrow Hill. In April 2005 it became the first Deltic to be fitted with TPWS equipment.

Two cabs were saved after withdrawal:
 One cab from D9008 (55 008) The Green Howards was acquired when the locomotive was being scrapped at Doncaster Works in August 1982. 55 008 is mounted on a road trailer and has been fitted out with computer simulation equipment which allows anybody to take the controls. In October 2003, the cab was painted to masquerade as British Rail DP2.
 One cab from D9021 (55 021) Argyll & Sutherland Highlander was acquired when the locomotive was scrapped at Doncaster Works in September 1982. It was privately purchased and positioned within sight of the Great Western Main Line at South Stoke, west of Reading. It was later sold to another private owner before being purchased by the Deltic Preservation Society. It has subsequently been sold on to the South Wales Loco Cab Preservation Group.

Operations after BR withdrawal 

Despite the ban on privately owned diesel locomotives operating on BR tracks, railway enthusiasts did not have to wait that long after the final withdrawal of the class to see a Deltic back on the mainline. Following participation in the hastily arranged 'Farewell to the Deltics' open day at British Rail Engineering Limited's Doncaster Works on 27 February 1982, 55 002 left Doncaster under its own power and ran back up the ECML to the National Railway Museum light engine; it was to be some years before a Deltic was officially allowed to run again on the mainline.

The next opportunity to see a Deltic back on the mainline and running under its own power was in April 1985 when D9000 was sent (at the request of ScotRail management) light engine from Haymarket depot to Perth for an open day. Following newspaper comments by ScotRail's manager Chris Green around that time there was hope that D9000 might see regular work on ScotRail's lines. Chris Green's move to the management team at the newly created Network SouthEast in 1986 put paid to that. However, that did not end his involvement with D9000. He arranged for Network South East depots to provide accommodation for both D9000 and D9016 and when he moved on to head up Virgin Rail Group D9000 was used on summer Saturday Virgin CrossCountry services in the late 1990s.

With the changes taking place on Britain's railways in the 1990s, the outlook changed for preserved diesel locomotives. In British Rail days no privately owned diesel locomotives were allowed to operate on its tracks. With privatisation came open-access railways—the track and infrastructure were owned and operated by Railtrack, who for a fee would allow approved locomotives and trains to operate on their track. Suddenly, the owners of preserved locomotives were on an equal footing with everyone else.

In 1996 the Deltic 9000 Fund was incorporated as Deltic 9000 Locomotives Ltd (DNLL) with the objective of returning its locomotives to main-line service and on 30 November 1996 D9000 Royal Scots Grey hauled the 'Deltic Deliverance' charter from Edinburgh to King's Cross. This tour however ended prematurely at Berwick-upon-Tweed after a fire broke out in the loco's engine room. D9000 went on to haul many charter trains and service trains for both Anglia Railways and Virgin CrossCountry until 2003. Subsequently, DNLL's other Deltic, D9016 Gordon Highlander returned to main-line working (it was temporarily painted in a purple and grey livery based upon the house colours of Porterbrook, who helped finance the restoration), as did the Deltic Preservation Society's D9009 Alycidon and 55 019 Royal Highland Fusilier. Between 1997 and 2003 all four main-line certified locomotives saw frequent charter and spot hire use, including on the Venice Simplon Orient Express. A highlight of this period was 22 May 1999, when D9000 Royal Scots Grey, D9009 Alycidon and 55 019 Royal Highland Fusilier were all in operation on the East Coast Main Line on the same day – D9000 running the "George Mortimer Pullman" British Pullman between London Victoria and Bradford Forster Square and the DPS Deltics working two charter trains between King's Cross and York. On the return run from Bradford, D9000 was held in platform 1 at Doncaster, whilst 55 019 passed on the up through line. D9000 then followed 55 019 as far as Belle Isle, where it diverged for the run around London to Victoria.

In 2003, DNLL went into liquidation with the result that D9000 and D9016 were sold to private individuals. From July 2003 to March 2005 no Deltics hauled a train on the main line. After a brief return to the main line in 2005 the DPS withdrew their last Deltic (55 019) at the end of 2005, having run three tours during the year. D9015 Tulyar is currently undergoing a full overhaul at Barrow Hill, with the aim of main line operation, whilst 55 002 The King's Own Yorkshire Light Infantry is currently painted in BR blue, main line certificated, and operates from the National Railway Museum. 55 019 remains in full working order along with D9009, whilst D9016 is currently able to operate on one engine only.

On 23 September 2006, 55 022 (D9000) Royal Scots Grey returned to the main line after a lengthy and extensive restoration at Barrow Hill, carried out on behalf of the owners by the DPS. It successfully hauled the SRPS 'Moray Mint' railtour from Edinburgh to Inverness, via Perth on the outward trip and back via Aberdeen. On its second working two weeks later, severe damage occurred to the number 2 end engine. The engine suffered from a leg out of bed, a term which means the engine con-rod breaks out of the engine crankcase. This left Royal Scots Grey still able to operate but on one engine only. By January 2007, the faulty power unit was removed from 55 022, put into storage and replaced by an ex-marine Napier Deltic engine modified for rail use; work was completed by Royal Scots Grey'''s restoration team in August 2007. After extensive testing at the East Lancs Railway the locomotive hauled its first tour since the previous engine malfunction on RTC's 'Autumn Highlander' with 50 049 and 40 145 in October 2007. 55 022 successfully hauled a number of charter tour services during 2008 but the replacement marine-sourced engine gave rise for concern following the discovery of oil in the coolant and at the end of August the locomotive was removed from future large railtour duties. The locomotive continued working mainline duty by visiting other preserved railway and moving other non-mainline registered locomotives.

In mid January 2007, an agreement was reached between heritage railway Peak Rail and the owner of D9016 Gordon Highlander which entailed the move of the locomotive from Barrow Hill to the preserved line for a period of three years. It had been thought that D9016 would receive certain maintenance and restoration while on the railway. However, the sale of the locomotive to the Harry Needle Railroad Company and subsequent announcements indicated that the weekend runs of 27 and 28 September 2008 might be its last prior to component recovery and eventual scrapping. Despite previous indications to the contrary, HNRC put the locomotive up for sale during the last week of September 2008 and although the Gordon Highlander Preservation Group submitted a substantial bid it was not accepted and the immediate future (and owner) of the locomotive was shrouded in some mystery.

Subsequently, in October 2008, DRS announced in a press release that it had acquired D9016 Gordon Highlander'' from Harry Needle Railroad Company (HNRC): "The company is working with HNRC to return the locomotive to operational condition, although at the time of writing (June 2009) the locomotive is still stored at Barrow Hill awaiting attention. While the locomotive is not planned for an immediate return to service, DRS is confident that the locomotive will be returned to mainline service in the future. DRS intends to retain the locomotive's name". On 29 December 2009, it was announced that D9016 had been purchased by Beaver Sports (Yorks) Limited. It has subsequently operated (on one engine) on the East Lancashire Railway and the Great Central Railway, pending work to restore it to full working order.

In April 2011, 55 022 was hired in by GB Railfreight for bauxite freight working between North Blyth and the Lynemouth aluminium smelter. This hire was scheduled to last from April to July. From May 2013 to November 2015, 55 022 was chartered by GBRF to transfer First ScotRail EMU's for refurbishment. These included the entire fleet of s, which were moved between Yoker and Kilmarnock. The route taken, partially to prevent false fire alarms in underground tunnels caused by the Deltic engine's emissions, takes the train as far as Craigendoran on the north bank of the Clyde before turning round toward Kilmarnock.

On 29 November 2017 it was announced via the official Royal Scots Grey website that 55 022 and D9016, plus all spares, had been sold by Martin Walker to Locomotive Services Limited, with both making the trip to LSL's Crewe Diesel TMD base in December 2017. It is intended that both locomotives will ultimately be repaired (55 022 currently has engine problems and D9016 is coming to the end of bodywork repairs) and operated on the mainline alongside Hosking's sizable locomotive fleet. By June 2018, 55 022 was under repair while D9016 had been placed in store and was transferred, cosmetically restored, to Locomotive Storage Limited's facility at Margate.

Fleet details

Proposed Deltic locomotives 

A 72-ton Bo-Bo locomotive, using a single 18 cylinder Deltic engine, was proposed as an alternative to what became the British Rail Class 37 Type 3 locomotive introduced from 1960.

A Co-Co "Super Deltic" was proposed but not built. The locomotives would have looked very similar to the eventual Class 50s, though slightly longer. All three designs would have had two 18-cylinder turbocharged engines, based on the 9-cylinder turbocharged engine used in the British Rail Class 23 "Baby Deltic" and the locomotive would have been designated Class 51. The Class 55's engines were not turbocharged, although they did have centrifugal scavenging blowers.

Model Railways
The first OO gauge model was produced by Hornby Dublo in 2 versions. D9012 "Crepello" was the 2 rail version and D9001 "St Paddy" was the 3 rail version. The second OO gauge model was produced by Lima, in two versions initially: D9003 "Meld" in BR Green; and 9006 "The Fife & Forfar Yeomanry" in BR Blue. The same models were also released in N gauge (1:160 scale), however these did not last very long, as Lima eventually decided to concentrate its British outline output on OO gauge.

Bachmann have since released a new version of the "Deltic", in both the OO gauge "Branchline" range and their N gauge "Graham Farish" range. Bachmann have also produced the "Deltic Prototype" in OO gauge (previously only available as a plastic kit from either Kitmaster or Dapol), however this had been commissioned by Locomotion Models - the model railways arm of the Nation Railway Museum - and was not generally available in model shops. A "Graham Farish" N gauge model is available, as a stand-alone model, and as part of the "Merseyside Express" train set.

In 2012 Hornby Railways launched a version of the BR Class 55, which is basic representation of the prototype as part of their Railroad range in BR Blue and BR Green in OO gauge. This model was essentially the old Lima tooling with a new chassis.

Accurascale announced a new range of OO gauge "Deltics", in a wide variety of liveries, which released in summer 2022.

In February 2023 Hornby announced a new diecast Dublo tooling in OO gauge of the Deltic prototype locomotive, English Electric DP1 'Deltic', fitted with sound (R30297TXS).

See also
 British Rail DP2 - prototype locomotive, built 1962, which used a Deltic bodyshell, but had a different engine.

References and sources

References

Sources

Further reading

External links 

Royal Scots Grey – owners of Royal Scots Grey
The Deltic Preservation Society – owners of several locomotives and cabs
The Chronicles of Napier – on the production Deltics
The King’s Own Yorkshire Light Infantry (KOYLI) Group – restorers

Napier Deltic
55
Co-Co locomotives
English Electric locomotives
Vulcan Foundry locomotives
Railway locomotives introduced in 1961
East Coast Main Line
Standard gauge locomotives of Great Britain
Diesel-electric locomotives of Great Britain